Shāh Karim al-Husayni (born 13 December 1936), known by the religious title Mawlānā Hazar Imam by his Ismaili followers and elsewhere as Aga Khan IV, is the 49th and current Imam of Nizari Ismailis, a denomination within Shia Islam. He has held the position of imam and the title of Aga Khan since 11 July 1957, when, at the age of 20, he succeeded his grandfather, Sir Sultan Muhammad Shah Aga Khan III. The Aga Khan claims direct lineal descent from the Islamic prophet Muhammad through Muhammad's cousin and son-in-law, Ali, considered an imam in Shia Islam, and Ali's wife Fatima, Muhammad's daughter from his first marriage.

His grandfather, Aga Khan III, states in his memoirs that the Shias had a "need (for) Divine guidance" after the Prophet of Islam's death, this need being fulfilled by the Imamate. According to the Aga Khan III as mentioned in his memoirs, he has actual "Divine power, guidance, and leadership (authority)." The Institution of Imamate has continued to present day with the Aga Khan IV as the 49th Imam of the Ismaili Muslim Community. The Aga Khan is a business magnate with British and Portuguese citizenship, as well as a racehorse owner and breeder.

Aga Khan's net worth has been estimated at $13.3 billion. Forbes describes the Aga Khan as one of the world's fifteen richest royals. He is the founder and chairman of the Aga Khan Development Network, one of the largest private development networks in the world. 

Since his ascension to the Imamate of the Nizari Ismailis in 1957, the Aga Khan has been involved in complex political and economic changes which have affected his followers, including the independence of African countries from colonial rule, the expulsion of Asians from Uganda, the independence of Central Asian countries such as Tajikistan from the former Soviet Union and the continuous turmoil in Afghanistan and Pakistan. Aga Khan IV became the first faith leader to address the Joint Session of the Parliament of Canada on 27 February 2014.

Early life and education

The Aga Khan IV is the eldest son of Prince Aly Khan (1911–1960), and his first wife, Princess Taj-ud-dawlah Aga Khan, formerly Joan Yarde-Buller (1908–1997), the eldest daughter of the British peer John Yarde-Buller, 3rd Baron Churston.

Born in Geneva, Switzerland, on 13 December 1936, Prince Karim was declared healthy despite being born prematurely. His brother, Amyn Aga Khan, was born less than a year later. In 1949, his parents divorced in part due to Prince Aly Khan's extramarital affairs, and Prince Aly Khan shortly after married American actress Rita Hayworth – with whom he had a daughter, Princess Yasmin Aga Khan, the half-sister of Aga Khan IV.

The Aga Khan IV also had a half-brother, Patrick Benjamin Guinness (1931–1965), from his mother's first marriage, as Joan Yarde-Buller was previously married to Loel Guinness of the banking Guinnesses.

Prince Karim spent his childhood in Nairobi, Kenya, where his early education was by private tutoring. Prince Karim later attended the Institut Le Rosey in Switzerland, the most expensive boarding school in the world, for nine years where he ended up with, in his words, "fair grades". As a youngster Prince Karim would have preferred to attend MIT and study science, but his grandfather, Aga Khan III, vetoed the decision and Prince Karim attended Harvard University, where he was elected a member of The Delphic Club. There he majored in Islamic history.

When his grandfather died, the young Prince was thrust into the position of the Aga Khan (IV), and he went from being not only a university student but also replacing his grandfather as the new Nizari Imam. He said about it: "Overnight, my whole life changed completely. I woke up with serious responsibilities toward millions of other human beings. I knew I would have to abandon my hopes of studying for a doctorate in History." He graduated from Harvard University in 1959, two years after becoming the Imam of the Nizari Ismailis, with a Bachelor of Arts degree in History (with Cum Laude honours) and his varsity H for football (soccer).

The young Aga Khan was a competitive downhill skier, and skied for Iran in the 1964 Winter Olympics.

Ascension to Nizari Ismaili Imamat
Following the death of his grandfather the Aga Khan III, Prince Karim, at the age of 20, became the 49th Imam of the Nizari Ismailis and Aga Khan IV, bypassing his father, Prince Aly Khan, and his uncle, Prince Sadruddin Aga Khan, who were in direct line to succession. In his will, the Aga Khan III explained the rationale for choosing his eldest grandson as his successor (which marked the second time in the history of the Nizari Ismaili chain of Imamat that a grandson of the preceding Imam – instead of one of the sons of the preceding Imam – was made the next Imam):

In view of the fundamentally altered conditions in the world has provoked many changes, including the discoveries of atomic science, I am convinced that it is in the best interests of the Nizari Ismaili community that I should be succeeded by a young man who has been brought up and developed during recent years and in the midst of the new age, and who brings a new outlook on life to his office.

In light of his grandfather's will, the Aga Khan IV has sometimes been referred to by Nizari Ismailis as the "Imam of the Atomic Age". The will of the Aga Khan III added that the next Aga Khan, in the first several years of his Imamat, should look to the Aga Khan III's widow for guidance on general matters pertaining to the Imamat:

I DESIRE that my successor shall, during the first seven years of his Imamat, be guided on questions of general Imamat Policy, by my said wife, Yvette called Yve Blanche Labrousse Om Habibeh, the BEGUM AGA KHAN, who has been familiar for many years with the problems facing my followers, and in whose wise judgment, I place the greatest confidence.

Nizari Ismaili Imamat

Upon taking the position of Imam, the Aga Khan IV stated that he intended to continue the work his grandfather had pursued in building modern institutions to improve the quality of life of the Nizari Ismailis. Takht nashini (installation of the new Imam) ceremonies occurred at several locations over the course of 1957 and 1958. During this time, the Aga Khan emphasized to his followers the importance of fostering positive relations with different ethnicities – a message highly appropriate considering the racially tense atmosphere in East Africa at the time between blacks and South Asians. During the Aga Khan's installation ceremonies in the Indian subcontinent, the Aga Khan stressed his commitment to improving the standard of living of Nizari Ismailis and encouraged co-operation with individuals of other religions.

In 1972, under the regime of President Idi Amin of Uganda, people of South Asian origin, including Nizari Ismailis, were expelled. The South Asians, some of whose families had lived in Uganda for over 100 years, were given 90 days to leave the country. The Aga Khan phoned his long-time friend Canadian Prime Minister Pierre Trudeau. Trudeau's government agreed to allow thousands of Nizari Ismailis to immigrate to Canada. The Aga Khan also undertook urgent steps to facilitate the resettlement of Nizari Ismailis displaced from Uganda, Tanzania, Kenya, and Burma, to other countries. Most of these Nizari Ismailis found new homes in Asia, Europe and North America. Most of the initial resettlement problems were overcome rapidly by Nizari Ismailis due to their educational backgrounds and high rates of literacy, as well as the efforts of the Aga Khan and the host countries, and with support from Nizari Ismaili community programs.

The Aga Khan has encouraged Nizari Ismailis settled in the industrialised world to contribute towards the progress of communities in the developing world through various development programs. He has described his role as Imam as being partly to uplift the material and spiritual wellbeing of Nizari Ismailis – a duty which requires an understanding of Nizari Ismailis in the context of their geographic location and their time. He elaborated on this concept in a 2006 speech in Germany, saying "The role and responsibility of an Imam, therefore, is both to interpret the faith to the community, and also to do all within his means to improve the quality, and security, of their daily lives and the people with whom Ismailis share their lives." This engagement of the Aga Khan with Nizari Ismailis is said to extend to the people with whom the Nizari Ismailis share their lives, locally and internationally.

The Aga Khan is one of several Shia signatories of the Amman Message which gives a broad foundation for defining those denominations of Islam that should be considered as part of the wider Muslim Ummah.

During the Pope Benedict XVI Islam controversy, he said:

I have two reactions to the pope's lecture: There is my concern about the degradation of relations and, at the same time, I see an opportunity. A chance to talk about a serious, important issue: the relationship between religion and logic.

When the Aga Khan IV was asked about his view on the consumption of alcohol in a 1965 interview with The Sunday Times, he said, in line with Muslim teaching:

Our belief is that the thing which separates man from the animals is his power of thought. Anything that impedes this process is wrong. Therefore, alcohol is forbidden. I have never touched alcohol. But this, to me, is not a puritan prohibition. I don't want to drink. I've never wanted to drink. There's no pressure being placed on me by my religion.

The Status of the Imam in Nizari Ismailism

The Ismailis are a community of Shi'a Islam, and their theology is derived from the teachings of the Shi'i Imams – 'Ali ibn Abi Talib, Muhammad al-Baqir and Ja'far al-Sadiq. According to early Shi'i Ismaili theology, God or Allah is absolutely transcendent and unique. Unlike Sunni theology where God's Essence is conjoined to eternal attributes, the early Shi'i Imams emphasized a theology according to which God's Essence is beyond all names and attributes. The first creation of God is a spiritual entity (Ruhani) or light (nur) called the Intellect ('Aql), the Light of Muhammad (nur Muhammad) or the Light of Ali. This cosmic Intellect or Light exists prior to the creation of the physical world and is the highest of created beings is identified with the Eternal Imam or the spiritual essence of the Prophet Muhammad and the Shi'i Imams. The historical Imams on earth are the locus of manifestation (mazhar) of the Light (nur) or Intellect (aql). Ismaili philosophers developed these ideas further using Neoplatonic frameworks and identified the Intellect ('Aql) or Light of the Imam with the Universal Intellect (Nous) of Plotinus. Similarly, the Imam's human soul – revered as pure based on Qur'an 33:33 – is regarded as the reflective mirror of the Universal Intellect.

The 1975 Ismailia Association Conference – a meeting of the Aga Khan with senior Nizari Ismaili council leaders from several countries – addressed the question of the status of the Imam. It mentioned:

"The Imam to be explained as the 'mazhar' ["locus of manifestation"] of God, and the relationship between God and the Imam to be related to varying levels of inspiration and communication from God to man." Paris Conference Report

The term mazhar is also used in Sufi literature by Ibn 'Arabi ("Bezels of Wisdom"), Nasir al-Din al-Tusi ("Contemplation and Action", "The Paradise of Submission") and many others. The meaning of the word mazhar denotes the idea of a mirror in which an object is reflected as an image but not incarnate. Similarly, the Imam as mazhar (locus of manifestation, mirror) 'differs greatly' from the idea of incarnation or indwelling (hulul) in which the Divine dwells inside a material body. The Imam is not seen as an incarnation of divinity. The Imam is also the Pir (Sufism) within Nizari Ismailism denoting a title from the Sufi heritage of Nizari Ismaili history.

Silver Jubilee Year of Imamat
From 11 July 1982 to 11 July 1983 – to celebrate the present Aga Khan's Silver Jubilee, marking the 25th anniversary of his accession to the Imamat – many new social and economic development projects were launched. These range from the establishment of the US$450 million international Aga Khan University with its Faculty of Health Sciences and teaching hospital based in Karachi, the expansion of schools for girls and medical centres in the Hunza region (one of the remote parts of Northern Pakistan bordering on China and Afghanistan that is densely populated with Nizari Ismailis), to the establishment of the Aga Khan Rural Support Program in Gujarat, India – and the extension of existing urban hospitals and primary health care centres in Tanzania and Kenya. Noor Karimi was married during the Silver Jubilee Year of Imamat and he even placed the ring on her finger.

Golden Jubilee Year of Imamat
11 July 2007 to 13 December 2008 marked the 50th Anniversary of the Aga Khan's reign of Imamat (Golden Jubilee). On this occasion, leaders representing Nizari Ismailis from different areas of the world gathered at the Aga Khan's residence to pay homage to the Imam. As part of the Golden Jubilee, the Aga Khan made official visits to various countries – using the visits to recognize the friendship and longstanding support of certain leaders of state, government, and others, to the Aga Khan and his Nizari Ismaili community, as well as to lay the foundations for certain future initiatives and programmes. Areas of the world visited included the Americas, Europe, Asia, and Africa. During his visit to Houston, USA, he announced the establishment of the Ismaili Center Houston. The Aga Khan also organized a Nizari Ismaili sports meet in Kenya, and teams of Nizari Ismailis from different areas of the world came to play in this event.

One of the initiatives of the Golden Jubilee was the Jubilee Games, firstly named as the Golden Jubilee Games but continued as the Jubilee Games. The first event was held in Kenya in 2008. The second Jubilee Games were held in Dubai, UAE in July 2016.

Diamond Jubilee Year of Imamat

11 July 2017 to 11 July 2018 was designated the Diamond Jubilee Year of the Aga Khan's 60th year of reign. The Aga Khan travelled throughout the Diamond Jubilee year to countries where his humanitarian institutions operate to launch new programs that help alleviate poverty and increase access to education, housing and childhood development. The Aga Khan's Diamond Jubilee opening ceremony was held in his Aiglemont estate. On 8 March 2018, Queen Elizabeth II hosted the Aga Khan at Windsor Castle at a dinner to mark his Diamond Jubilee. He has visited a number of countries including the United States, UAE, India, Pakistan, Canada, France, UK, Kenya, and others. The Diamond Jubilee ended with grand celebrations in Lisbon, Portugal on and around 11 July 2018. People from around the world came to celebrate with their worldwide community. There were many concerts, a Jubilee Arts festival, and other events planned for tens of thousands of people. Following a historic agreement with the Portuguese Republic in 2015, His Highness the Aga Khan officially designated the premises located at Rua Marquês de Fronteira in Lisbon – the Henrique de Mendonça Palace – as the Seat of the Ismaili Imamat on 11 July 2018, and declared that it be known as the "Diwan of the Ismaili Imamat".

Personal life
In 1969, the Aga Khan married former British model Sarah Frances Croker Poole, who assumed the name Begum Salimah Aga Khan upon marrying him. Sarah Frances was a divorcee, having previously been married to Lord James Charles Crichton-Stuart, son of John Crichton-Stuart, 5th Marquess of Bute. The wedding ceremonies were held on 22 October 1969 (civil) and 28 October 1969 (religious) at Karim Aga Khan's home in Paris. By 1984, the Aga Khan and Begum Salimah had taken to living separate lives. The Aga Khan and Begum Salimah had one daughter and two sons together, Zahra Aga Khan (born 18 September 1970), Rahim Aga Khan (born 12 October 1971) and Hussain Aga Khan (born 10 April 1974). Eleven years later, in 1995 they divorced. 

On 30 May 1998, The Aga Khan married for the second time at his walled compound and chateau, Aiglemont, in Gouvieux, France. The bride was Gabriele Renate Thyssen, who assumed the name Begum Inaara Aga Khan at her wedding. Born to Roman Catholic German entrepreneur parents in 1963, Gabriele was twenty-seven years younger than the Aga Khan. She was also a divorcee, having previously been married to Prince Karl Emich of Leiningen, by whom she had a daughter, Teresa. On 7 March 2000, two years after the wedding, he had a son, Aly Muhammad Aga Khan. On 8 October 2004, after six years of marriage the couple announced they would be getting divorced.  In September 2011, seven years later, a divorce settlement was reached between them in the French courts, and the divorce settlement amount was agreed upon in March 2014.

Personal finances
Forbes describes the Aga Khan as one of the world's fifteen richest royals, and the most recent estimate of his net worth is $13.3 billion. He is unique among the richest royals in that he does not preside over a geographic territory. He owns hundreds of racehorses, valuable stud farms, an exclusive yacht club on Sardinia, Bell Island in the Bahamas, two Bombardier jets, a £100 million high speed yacht Alamshar, and several estates around the world, with his primary residence at Aiglemont estate in the town of Gouvieux, France, north of Paris. The Aga Khan's philanthropic non-profit institutions spend about US$600 million per year – mainly in Africa, Asia, and the Middle East.

The Aga Khan is and has been involved in multiple business ventures, in such areas as communications media and luxury hotels. In 1959 he founded the Kenyan media company Nation Media Group. In the 1990s, the Aga Khan had a group of US$400 a night Italian luxury hotels, called Ciga. Currently the Aga Khan, through his for-profit AKFED, is the largest shareholder in the Serena Hotels chain. The Aga Khan's racing horse businesses bring in considerable income. He owns and operates the largest horse racing and breeding operation in France, the French horse auction house, Arqana, Gilltown Stud near Kilcullen in Ireland, and other breeding/stud farms in Europe.

In 2009, Forbes reported that the Aga Khan's net worth was US$1 billion. In 2013, Vanity Fair estimated his fortune to be well over US$1 billion.

In 2021 Aga Khan took delivery of a new Bombardier Global 7500 registered LX-PAK, operated by Global Jet Luxembourg. His previous aircraft, a Bombardier Global 6000, registered LX-ZAK, was sold in 2020.

Work

Aga Khan Development Network

The Aga Khan is the founder and chairman of the Aga Khan Development Network, which coordinates the activities of over 200 agencies and institutions, employing approximately 80,000 paid staff, the majority of whom are based in developing countries. AKDN is partly funded by his followers and donor partners that include numerous governments and several international organisations. AKDN agencies operate in the fields of health, education, culture, rural development, institution-building and the promotion of economic development, with a special focus on countries of the Developing Nations. It is dedicated to improving living conditions and opportunities for the poor, without regard to their faith, origin or sex.

AKDN includes the Aga Khan University, the University of Central Asia, the for-profit Aga Khan Fund for Economic Development, the Aga Khan Trust for Culture, the Aga Khan Foundation, the Aga Khan Health Services, the Aga Khan Education Services, the Aga Khan Planning and Building Services, and the Aga Khan Agency for Microfinance. One of the companies that the AKFED is the main shareholder of is the Serena Hotels Group – a chain of luxury hotels and resorts primarily located in Africa and Asia.
The Aga Khan Award for Architecture is the largest architectural award in the world. The Aga Khan is also the chairman of the Board of Governors of the Institute of Ismaili Studies, which he founded in 1977. He is also a Vice-President of the Royal Commonwealth Society.

Focus Humanitarian Assistance, an affiliate of the AKDN, is responsible for emergency response in the face of disaster. Recent disasters that FOCUS was involved in helping address include the 2005 earthquake in Pakistan (AKDN earthquake response) and the South Asian tsunami.

Significant recent or current projects that are related to the development and that are being led by the Aga Khan include the Delegation of the Ismaili Imamat and the Global Centre for Pluralism in Ottawa, the Aga Khan Museum in Toronto, the Al-Azhar Park in Cairo, the Bagh-e Babur restoration in Kabul, and a network of full IB residential schools known as the Aga Khan Academies.

The Aga Khan has expressed concern about the work of the AKDN being described as philanthropy. In his address to the Evangelische Akademie Tutzing, when he was awarded their Tolerance Prize in 2006, he described this concern:

Reflecting a certain historical tendency of the West to separate the secular from the religious, they often describe [the work of the AKDN] either as philanthropy or entrepreneurship. What is not understood is that this work is for us a part of our institutional responsibility – it flows from the mandate of the office of Imam to improve the quality of worldly life for the concerned communities.

Promotion of Islamic architecture
In 1977, the Aga Khan established the Aga Khan Award for Architecture, an award recognising excellence in architecture that encompasses contemporary design and social, historical, and environmental considerations. It is the largest architectural award in the world (prize money for which is a million US dollars) and is granted triennially. The award grew out of the Aga Khan's desire to revitalise creativity in Islamic societies and acknowledge creative solutions for buildings facilities and public spaces. The prize winner is selected by an independent master jury convened for each cycle.

In 1979, Harvard University and the Massachusetts Institute of Technology (MIT) established the Aga Khan Program for Islamic Architecture (AKPIA), which is supported by an endowment from Aga Khan. These programs provide degree courses, public lectures, and conferences for the study of Islamic architecture and urbanism. Understanding contemporary conditions and developmental issues are key components of the academic program. The program engages in research at both institutions and students can graduate with a Master of Science of Architectural Studies specialising in the Aga Khan program from MIT's Department of Architecture.

Thoroughbred horse racing

The Aga Khan operates a large horse racing and breeding operation at his estate Aiglemont, in the town of Gouvieux in the Picardy region of France – about 4 kilometres (2½ miles) west of the Chantilly Racecourse. In 1977, he paid £1.3 million for the bloodstock owned by Anna Dupré and in 1978, £4.7 million for the bloodstock of Marcel Boussac.

The Aga Khan is said to be France's most influential owner-breeder and record winner of The Prix de Diane, sometimes referred to as the French Oaks.

The Aga Khan owns Gilltown Stud near Kilcullen, Ireland, and the Haras de Bonneval breeding farm at Le Mesnil-Mauger in France. In March 2005, he purchased the Calvados stud farms, the Haras d'Ouilly in Pont-d'Ouilly and the Haras de Val-Henry in Livarot. Haras d'Ouilly had been owned by such horsemen as the Duc Decazes, François Dupré and Jean-Luc Lagardère.

In 2006 the Aga Khan became the majority shareholder of French horse auction house Arqana.

On 27 October 2009 it was announced that Sea the Stars, regarded by many as one of the greatest racehorses of all time, would stand stud at the Aga Khan's Gilltown Stud in Ireland.

His unbeaten homebred filly, Zarkava, won the 2008 Prix de l'Arc de Triomphe. His homebred colt, Harzand, won the 2016 Epsom Derby and the 2016 Irish Derby.

The Aga Khan was the lead owner of Shergar, the Irish racehorse that was kidnapped from Ballymany stud farm in County Kildare, Ireland by masked men in 1983 and held for ransom. The Aga Khan and the other co-owners refused to pay a ransom, and the horse was not recovered. The Aga Khan, the police and the public suspected the Provisional Irish Republican Army of the abduction, though the IRA denied all involvement. In 1999, former IRA member Sean O'Callaghan published an autobiography in which he implicates the IRA as being responsible for the abduction. Shergar had become a national symbol in Ireland, and the IRA had underestimated the public outpouring of support for the horse and the backlash for the IRA even among Irish republicans who had historically supported the IRA, leading the IRA to deny involvement.

Yacht Alamshar
The Aga Khan is an ardent yachtsman. He co-founded the Yacht Club Costa Smeralda in Porto Cervo, Sardinia in 1967. He also commissioned a 164-foot yacht, Alamshar, named after a prized racehorse of his, with a price tag of £200 million. The cost and maintenance are partly covered by chartering. The yacht was advertised as having a top speed of 60 knots, capable of setting a new transatlantic speed record. It reached a speed in excess of 55 knots in its initial trials but despite the claims, it was never intended for transatlantic speed records as it does not have the range.

Titles, styles and honours
The titles Prince and Princess are used by the Aga Khans and their children by virtue of their descent from Shah Fath Ali Shah of the Persian Qajar dynasty. The title was officially recognised by the British government in 1938.

Author Farhad Daftary wrote of how the honorific title Aga Khan (from Agha and Khan) was first given to Aga Khan I at the age of thirteen after the murder of his father: "At the same time, the Qajar monarch bestowed on him the honorific title (laqab) of Agha Khan (also transcribed as Aqa Khan), meaning lord and master." Daftary additionally commented, "The title of Agha Khan remained hereditary amongst his successors." On the other hand, in a legal proceeding, the Aga Khan III noted that 'Aga Khan' is not a title, but, instead a sort of alias or "pet name" that was given to Aga Khan I when he was a young man.

The style of His Highness was formally granted to the Aga Khan IV by Queen Elizabeth II in 1957 upon the death of his grandfather Aga Khan III. The granting of the title to the Aga Khan IV was preceded by a strong expressed desire of the Aga Khan III to see the British monarchy award the non-hereditary title to his successor. The style of His Royal Highness was granted in 1959 to the Aga Khan IV by Mohammad Reza Pahlavi, the Shah of Iran, later overthrown in the Iranian Revolution of 1979, but he uses instead His Highness.
Over the years, the Aga Khan has received numerous honours, honorary degrees, and awards.

Honours
 :
 Member 1st Class of the Order of Bahrain (2003)
 :
 Honorary Companion of the Order of Canada (CC, 2005)
 :
 Grand Cross of the Order of the Green Crescent (1966)
 :
 Grand Cross of the Legion of Honour (2018)
 Commander of the Order of Arts and Letters (2010)
 :
 Padma Vibhushan (2015)
  Iran:
 Grand Cordon of the Order of the Crown (1967)
 Commemorative Medal of the 2500th Anniversary of the founding of the Persian Empire (14 October 1971)
 :
 Knight Grand Cross of the Order of Merit of the Italian Republic (1977) 
 Knight of the Order of Merit for Labour (1988)
 :
 Grand Cross of the National Order of the Ivory Coast (1965)
 :
 Chief of the Order of the Golden Heart of Kenya (CGH, 2007)
 :
 Grand Cross 2nd Class of the National Order of Madagascar (1966)
 :
 Grand Cross of the National Order of Mali (2008)
 :
 Commander of the National Order of Merit (1960)
 :
 Grand Cordon of the Order of the Throne (1986)
 :
 Nishan-e-Pakistan (NPk, 1983)
 Nishan-i-Imtiaz (NI, 1970)
 :
 Grand Cross of the Order of Liberty (GCL, 2017)
 Grand Cross of the Order of Christ (GCC, 2005)
 Grand Cross of the Order of Merit (GCM, 1998)
 Grand Cross of the Order of Prince Henry (GCIH, 1960)
 :
 Grand Officer of the National Order of the Lion (1982)
 :
 Grand Cross of the Order of Civil Merit (1991)
 :
 Recipient of the Order of Friendship (1998)
 :
 Collar of the Order of the Pearl of Africa (2017)
 :
 Ordinary Knight Commander of the Order of the British Empire (KBE, 2003)
  Upper Volta:
 Grand Cross of the National Order of Upper Volta (1965)
  Zanzibar:
 Grand Cross of the Order of the Brilliant Star of Zanzibar (1957)

Honorary degrees
 : Honorary LL.D. degree, Simon Fraser University (2018)
 : Honorary LL.D. degree, University of British Columbia (2018)
 : Honorary LL.D. degree, University of Calgary (2018)
 : Honorary LL.D. degree, McGill University (1983)
 : Honorary LL.D. degree, McMaster University (1987)
 : Honorary LL.D. degree, University of Toronto (2004)
 :  Honorary LL.D. degree, University of Alberta (2009)
 : Honorary DUniv degree, University of Ottawa (2012)
 : Honorary D.S.Litt. degree, University of Toronto (2013)
 : Honorary D.Litt. degree in medieval studies, Pontifical Institute of Mediaeval Studies (2016)
 : Honorary LL.D. degree, University of Sindh (1970)
 : Honorary PhD degree, NOVA University of Lisbon (2017)
 : Honorary LL.D. degree, University of Wales (1993)
 : Honorary D.D. degree, University of Cambridge (2009)
 : Honorary LL.D. degree, Brown University (1996)
 : Honorary LL.D. degree, Harvard University (2008)

Awards
 : Key to the City of Ottawa (2005)
 : Honorary Canadian citizenship (2010)
 : Silver Medal of the Académie d'Architecture (1991)
 : Insignia of Honour, International Union of Architects (2001)
 : Associate Foreign Member, Académie des Beaux-Arts (2008)
 : Philanthropic Entrepreneur of the Year, by Le Nouvel Economiste, Paris (2009)
 : Die Quadriga Award, the United We Care Award (2005)
 : Tolerance Prize of the Evangelical Academy of Tutzing (2006)
 : Honorary Citizen of the Town of Arzachena (Sardinia) (1962)
 : Gold Mercury Ad Personam Award, Non-State Organization (1982)
 : Freeman of Abidjan, and presented with a Key to the City of Abidjan (1960)
 : One of The 500 Most Influential Muslims in the world, by Royal Islamic Strategic Studies Centre (2009–13)
 : State Award for Peace and Progress (2002)
 : Honoured Educator of the Republic of Kazakhstan (2008)
 : Honorary Citizen of the Town of Kisumu (1981)
 : Key to the city of Majunga (1966)
 : Honorary Citizen of the Islamic Ummah of Timbuktu (2003)
 : Citizen of Honour of the Municipality of Timbuktu (2008)
 : Honorary Colonel of the 6th Lancers by the Pakistani Army (1970)
 : Honorary Citizen of Lahore, and presented with a key to the city of Lahore (1980)
 : Honorary Membership, Pakistan Medical Association, Sindh (1981)
 : Key to the city of Karachi (1981)
 : Honorary Fellowship of the College of Physicians and Surgeons Pakistan (CPSP) (1985)
 : Key to the City of Lisbon (1996)
 : Foreign Member, Class of Humanities, by Lisbon Academy of Sciences (2009)
 : 2013 North–South Prize of the Council of Europe (2014)
 : Key to the City of Porto (2019)
 : Carnegie Medal for Philanthropy (2005)
 : Guest of Honour of Granada (1991)
 : Honorary Citizen of Granada (1991)
 : Gold Medal of the City of Granada (1998)
 : Royal Toledo Foundation (Real Fundación de Toledo) Award (2006)
 : Archon Award, International Nursing Honour Society, Sigma Theta Tau International (2001)
 : Honorary Citizen of Dar es Salaam (2005)
 : The Gold Mercury International "AD PERSONAM" Award (1982)
 : Honorary Fellowship, Royal Institute of British Architects (1991)
 : Andrew Carnegie Medal of Philanthropy (2005)
 : Winner of the 10th annual Peter O'Sullevan Award at the Savoy in London (2006)
 : Thomas Jefferson Memorial Foundation Medal in Architecture, University of Virginia (1984)
 : Institute Honor of the American Institute of Architects (1984)
 : Honorary Member of the American Institute of Architects (1992)
 : Foreign Honorary Member of the American Academy of Arts and Sciences (1996)
 : Hadrian Award, World Monuments Fund (1996)
 : Vincent Scully Prize, National Building Museum (2005)
 : Key to the City of Austin (2008)
 : UCSF medal (2011) 
 : Key to the City of Sugar Land, Texas (2018)
 : ULI J.C. Nichols Prize for Visionaries in Urban Development, Los Angeles (2011)
 : Honorary Citizen of the City of Samarkand and presented with a key to the city of Samarkand (1992)

Ancestry

Patrilineal descent

Shah Karim al-Hussaini Aga Khan's patriline is the line from which he is descended father to son.

Nizari Imams of the Fatimid Dynasty
Adnan
Ma'ad ibn Adnan
Nizar ibn Ma'ad
Mudar ibn Nizar
Ilyas ibn Mudar
Mudrikah ibn Ilyas
Khuzayma ibn Mudrika
Kinanah ibn Khuzayma
An-Nadr ibn Kinanah
Malik ibn Al-Nadr
Fihr ibn Malik
Ghalib ibn Fihr
Lu'ayy ibn Ghalib
Ka'b ibn Lu'ayy
Murrah ibn Ka'b
Kilab ibn Murrah b. ca. 372
Qusay ibn Kilab ca. 400-ca. 480
Abd Manaf ibn Qusai
Hashim ibn Abd Manaf, ca. 464-ca. 497
Abd al-Muttalib, ca. 497–578
Abu Talib ibn Abd al-Muttalib, 535–619
4th Caliph and 1st Imam Ali ibn Abu Talib, 601–661, cousin and son-in-law of the Prophet Muhammad
2nd Imam Husayn ibn Ali, 626–680
3rd Imam Ali ibn Husayn Zayn al-Abidin, 659–713
4th Imam Muhammad al-Baqir, 677–733
5th Imam Jafar al-Sadiq, ca. 702–765
6th Imam Ismail ibn Jafar, ca. 722-ca. 762
7th Imam Muhammad ibn Ismail, 740–813
8th Imam Ahmad al-Wafi, 795/746-827/828
9th Imam Muhammad at-Taqi (Isma'ili), 813/814-839/840
10th Imam Radi Abdullah, 832–881
11th Imam Caliph Abdullah al-Mahdi Billah, 873–934
12th Imam Caliph Al-Qa'im, 893–946
13th Imam Caliph Al-Mansur Billah, 914–953
14th Imam Caliph Al-Mu'izz li-Din Allah, 932–975
15th Imam Caliph Al-Aziz Billah, 955–996
16th Imam Caliph Al-Hakim bi-Amr Allah, 985–1021
17th Imam Caliph Ali az-Zahir, 1005–1036
18th Imam Caliph Al-Mustansir Billah, 1029–1094
19th Imam Nizar al-Mustafa, 1045–1095
20th Imam Ali Al-Husayn Al-Hadi, 1076–1132
21st Imam Al-Muhtadi, Muhammad I, 1106–1157
22nd Imam Al-Qahir, Hasan I, 1126–1162
23rd Imam Hassan II of Alamut (also referred to as 'Alā Zikrihi-s-Salām), 1142/1145-1166 
24th Imam Muhammad II of Alamut, 1148–1210
25th Imam Hassan III of Alamut, 1187–1221
26th Imam Muhammad III of Alamut, 1211–1255
27th Imam Rukn al-Din Khurshah, ca. 1230-1256/1257
28th Imam Shams al-Din (Nizari), 1257–1310
29th Imam Qasim Shah, 1310–1368
30th Imam Islam Shah, d. 1424
31st Imam Muhammad ibn Islam Shah, d. 1464
32nd Imam Ali Shah Qalandar, al-Mustansir Billah II, d. 1480
33rd Imam Abd-us-Salam Shah, d. 1494
34th Imam Abbas Shah Gharib, al-Mustansir Billah III, d. 1498
35th Imam Abuzar Ali Nur Shah, d. ca. 1509
36th Imam Murād Mīrzā, d. 1574
37th Imam Zulfiqar Ali, Khalilullah I, d. 1634
38th Imam Nur al-Din Ali, d. 1671
39th Imam Ali, Khalilullah II, d. 1680
40th Imam Shah Nizar II , d. 1722
41st Imam Sayed Ali, d. ca. 1736
42nd Imam Al-Hassan Ali Beg, d. ca. 1747
43rd Imam Sayed Jafar, Al-Qasim Ali, d. ca. 1756
44th Imam Abū-l-Hasan ʻAlī, d. 1792
45th Imam Shah Khalilullah III, 1740–1817
46th Imam Hasan Ali Shah, Aga Khan I, 1804–1881
47th Imam Aqa Ali Shah, Aga Khan II, 1830–1885
48th Imam Sultan Muhammad Shah, Aga Khan III, 1877–1957
Prince Sayyid Aly Khan, 1911– 1960
49th Imam Shah Karim Al-Hussaini, Aga Khan IV, b. 1936

References

External links

 His Highness the Aga Khan
 NanoWisdoms Archive – Dedicated to the Aga Khan's speeches and interviews (over 600 readings and 1,000 quotes)
 His Highness the Aga Khan Spiritual Leader of Shia Ismailis
 An Islamic Conscience: the Aga Khan and the Ismailis – Film of HH the Aga Khan IV 
 About His Highness the Karim Aga Khan
 About Her Highness the Begum Aga Khan (PIF)
 Aga Khan Development Network
 The Institute of Ismaili Studies
 The Institute of Ismaili Studies: Introduction to His Highness the Aga Khan and Selected Speeches
 Aga Khan article at SIPA (Columbia University)
 Brown University President Vartan Gregorian's introduction of the Aga Khan (1996 baccalaureate address)
 The Ismaili website 
 Read the spirit
 A rare interview with the Aga Khan on poverty, climate change, and demystifying Islam Quartz
 The Secret Life of the Aga Khan

British imams
British philanthropists
1936 births
Living people
.
British billionaires
British Ismailis
Aga Khans
Qajar dynasty
Quran reciters
Alumni of Institut Le Rosey
Harvard University alumni
British people of Iranian descent
British people of Pakistani descent
People from Geneva
Alpine skiers at the 1960 Winter Olympics
Alpine skiers at the 1964 Winter Olympics
Olympic alpine skiers of Iran
British male alpine skiers
Knights Commander of the Order of the British Empire
Knights Grand Cross of the Order of Merit of the Italian Republic
Grand Crosses of the Order of Prince Henry
Grand Crosses of the Order of Merit (Portugal)
Grand Crosses of the Order of Christ (Portugal)
Grand Crosses of the Order of Liberty
Grand Cross of the Order of Civil Merit
Grand Crosses of the National Order of Mali
Recipients of the Order of Merit for Labour
Recipients of the Padma Vibhushan in trade & industry
20th-century imams
21st-century imams
20th-century Islamic religious leaders
21st-century Islamic religious leaders
20th-century Muslim scholars of Islam
21st-century Muslim scholars of Islam
Owners of Prix de l'Arc de Triomphe winners
Royal Olympic participants
Imams in the United Kingdom
British people of Arab descent
Portuguese people of Arab descent
20th-century Ismailis
21st-century Ismailis